The following is the guest list for the wedding of Princess Eugenie of York and Jack Brooksbank, which took place on 12 October 2018, at St George's Chapel, Windsor Castle.

Relatives of the bride

House of Windsor
 The Queen and The Duke of Edinburgh, the bride's paternal grandparents
 The Duke of York and Sarah, Duchess of York, the bride's parents
 Princess Beatrice of York, the bride's sister
 The Prince of Wales, the bride's paternal uncle
 The Duke and Duchess of Cambridge, the bride's first cousin and his wife
 Prince George of Cambridge, the bride's first cousin, once removed
 Princess Charlotte of Cambridge, the bride's first cousin, once removed
 The Duke and Duchess of Sussex, the bride's first cousin and his wife
 The Princess Royal and Vice Admiral Sir Timothy Laurence, the bride's paternal aunt and uncle
 Peter and Autumn Phillips, the bride's first cousin and his wife
 Savannah Phillips, the bride's first cousin, once removed
 Isla Phillips, the bride's first cousin, once removed
 Zara and Michael Tindall, the bride's first cousin and her husband
 Mia Tindall, the bride’s first cousin, once removed
 The Earl and Countess of Wessex, the bride's paternal uncle and aunt
 Lady Louise Mountbatten-Windsor, the bride's first cousin
 Viscount Severn, the bride's first cousin
The Princess Margaret, Countess of Snowdon's family:
 The Earl and Countess of Snowdon, the bride's first cousin, once removed and his wife
 Viscount Linley, the bride's second cousin
 Lady Margarita Armstrong-Jones, the bride's second cousin
 Lady Sarah and Daniel Chatto, the bride's first cousin, once removed and her husband
Other descendants of Princess Eugenie's great-great-grandfather King George V and their families:
 The Duke and Duchess of Gloucester, the bride's first cousin, twice removed and his wife
 The Duke of Kent, the bride's first cousin, twice removed
 Lady Helen and Timothy Taylor, the bride's second cousin, once removed and her husband
 Princess Alexandra, The Hon. Lady Ogilvy's family:
 James Ogilvy, the bride's second cousin, once removed and godfather
 Marina Ogilvy's family:
 Zenouska Mowatt, the bride’s third cousin
 Prince and Princess Michael of Kent, the bride's first cousin, twice removed and his wife
 Lord and Lady Frederick Windsor, the bride's second cousin, once removed and his wife
 Maud Windsor, the bride's third cousin and goddaughter
 Lady Gabriella Windsor and Thomas Kingston, the bride's second cousin, once removed and her fiancé

Ferguson family
 Jane Luedecke and Ramin Marzbani, the bride's maternal aunt and her guest
 Seamus Makin, the bride's first cousin
 Ayesha Specker, the bride's first cousin
 Heidi Luedecke, the bride's first cousin
 Nikki Marzbani
 Lady Swinburn, the bride's step-grandmother
 Andrew Ferguson and Florence Hill, the bride's maternal half-uncle and his fiancée
 Elizabeth and Henry Coob, the bride’s maternal half-aunt and uncle

Mountbatten family
 The Marquess and Marchioness of Milford Haven, the bride’s second cousin, once removed and his wife
 Lady Tatiana Mountbatten, the bride's third cousin
 Earl of Medina, the bride’s third cousin 
 Harry Wentworth-Stanley, the Marchioness' son
 Louisa Wentworth-Stanley, the Marchioness' daughter

Bowes-Lyon family
 Lady Elizabeth Shakerley, the bride's second cousin, once removed

Relatives of the groom
 George and Nicola Brooksbank, the groom's parents
 Thomas Brooksbank, the groom's brother
 David Brooksbank, the groom's paternal uncle
 Scott Brooksbank, the groom's first cousin
 Charles Brooksbank, the groom's first cousin
 Anna Brooksbank, the groom’s first cousin
 Sir Nicholas and Lady Brooksbank, the groom's first cousin, once removed and his wife
 Thomas Brooksbank, the groom's second cousin
 Victoria Brooksbank, the groom’s second cousin

Foreign non-reigning royalty and nobility

House of Schleswig-Holstein-Sonderburg-Glücksburg
 The Crown Prince and Crown Princess of Greece, the bride's third cousin and his wife
 Princess Maria-Olympia of Greece and Denmark, the bride's third cousin, once removed
 Prince Philippos of Greece and Denmark and Nina Flohr, the bride's third cousin and his guest

House of Hanover
 The Hereditary Prince and Hereditary Princess of Hanover, the bride's fourth cousin and his wife
 Prince and Princess Christian of Hanover, the bride's fourth cousin and his wife

House of Oettingen-Spielberg
 The Hereditary Prince and Hereditary Princess of Oettingen-Oettingen and Oettingen-Spielberg
 Princess Nora, Lady Max Percy and Lord Max Percy

House of Bismarck
 Countess Debonnaire von Bismarck-Schönhausen
 Count Nikolai von Bismarck-Schönhausen

Religious figures
 The Rt Rev. David Conner, Dean of Windsor
 The Most Rev. and Rt Hon John Sentamu, Archbishop of York

Friends of Princess Eugenie of York and Jack Brooksbank
Freddie Andrews
 Charles Attal
 Alessandra Ford Balzs
 Amit Bhatia
 Derek Blasberg
 Hayley Bloomingdale
 Julia de Boinville (friend and colleague of Princess Eugenie)
 Cressida Bonas (friend of Princess Eugenie) and her guest
 Holly Branson
 Emily Few Brown 
 Laura Brown
 Maria Tereza Turrion Burallo
 Jacobi Anstruther-Gough-Calthorpe
 Arnaud Cauchois
 Maddie Chesterton
 Chelsy Davy 
 Lauren De Niro Pipher
 Charles and Chloe Delevingne (father and sister of models Cara and Poppy Delevingne), and Chloe's husband, Edward Grant
 Sam Dougal
 Viscount Erleigh (Older brother of Lady Natasha Rufus Isaacs) 
 Hum Fleming
 Georgia Forbes
 Irene and Lydia Forte
 Sabine and Joseph Getty
 Olivier and Zoë de Givenchy (parents of page boy Louis de Givenchy)
 Jane Gottschalk
 Rianne ten Haken
 Charlie and Yoanna Hanbury
 Astrid and Davina Harbord
 Chantal Hochuli (ex-wife of Prince Ernst August of Hanover)
 Rory Hoddell 
 Edward Lawson Johnston
 Heather Kerzner
 Saloni Lodha
 Frederica Lowell-Pank
 Cavan Mahony Linde
 Elizabeth Mason
 Pippa and James Matthews (sister and brother-in-law of The Duchess of Cambridge)
 James Middleton (brother of The Duchess of Cambridge)
 Alice and Thomas Philip Naylor-Leyland
 Eugenie Niarchos
 Misha Nonoo 
 Edgar Osorio
 Kaki Paige
 David Peacock 
 Gabriella Peacock 
 Guy Pelly and his wife, Lizzie Wilson
 The Lady Melissa Percy (daughter of the 12th Duke of Northumberland])
 Annina Pfuel
 Emma Pilkington
 Natalie Pinkham
 Ollie Proudlock and his fiancée, Emma Louise Connolly
 Jamie Richards
 Lavinia Richards
 The Lady Natasha Rufus Isaacs and husband, Rupert Finch 
 Caroline Sieber
 Hannah Schuster
 Harriet Stewart
 Alexander Stileman
 Charlie van Straubenzee 
 Daisy van Straubenzee
 Lady Tang
 Edward Tang
 Joan Templeman
 Owain Walbyoff
 Martha Ward
 Susanna Warren
 Fritz von Westenholz
 The Duke of Westminster
 Molly Whitehall

Celebrity and other notable guests of the couple
 Isabella Anstruther-Gough-Calthorpe and her husband, Sam Branson
 Surinder Arora
 Richard Bacon and his wife, Rebecca MacFarlane
 Tamara Beckwith and her husband, Giorgio Veroni
 Andrea Bocelli, his wife Veronica Berti, and sons
 Arpad Busson
 Naomi Campbell
 Jimmy Carr and his girlfriend, Karoline Copping
 Edei
 David Emanuel (designed the wedding dress of Diana, Princess of Wales)
 The Lord and Lady Fellowes of West Stafford 
 Pixie Geldof and her husband, George Barnett
 Kate Moss and her daughter Lila-Grace Moss
 CK Cheung
 Manuel Fernandes
 Stephen Fry and his husband, Elliot Spencer
 Mark Guiducci, former editor-in-chief of Vogue
 Subodh Gupta
 Edward Hutley
 Tarek Kaituni
 Evgeny Lebedev
 Richard Liu
 Paddy McNally
 Liv Tyler and her husband, David Gardner
 Demi Moore and Eric Buterbaugh
 James Blunt and his wife, Sophie Wellesley (Wellesley is the granddaughter of the 8th Duke of Wellington)
 Ellie Goulding and her fiancé, Caspar Jopling
 Cara Delevingne with Derek Blasberg
 Poppy Delevingne and her husband, James Cook
 Tracey Emin
 Robbie Williams and Ayda Field, with Gwen Field
 Rudolf Maag
 Ricky Martin and his husband, Jwan Yosef
 Zac Posen and his mother, Susan
 Jamie Redknapp
 Holly Valance and her husband, Nick Candy
 Jack Whitehall
 Philip Winser
 Iwan Wirth (Princess Eugenie's boss)

Charities
Princess Eugenie and Jack Brooksbank invited representatives from charities and organisations that they support.

Healthcare and young people
 Royal National Orthopaedic Hospital
 Teenage Cancer Trust
 Street Child

Anti-slavery
 The Salvation Army
 The UN Trust Fund to End Violence Against
 Key to Freedom

Military
 Supporting Wounded Veterans

Animals and conservation
 The Big Cat Sanctuary
 Elephant Family
 Project 0
 Charity: Water

The Arts
 The Print Room at The Coronet
 Tate Young Patrons

Bridal party

Best Man

 Thomas Brooksbank, brother of the groom

Maid of Honour

 Princess Beatrice of York, sister of the bride

Bridesmaids and page boys

 Prince George of Cambridge, aged 5 – son of The Duke and Duchess of Cambridge
 Princess Charlotte of Cambridge, aged 3 – daughter of The Duke and Duchess of Cambridge
 Louis de Givenchy, aged 6 – son of Zoë and Olivier de Givenchy
 Savannah Phillips, aged 7 – daughter of Autumn and Peter Phillips
 Isla Phillips, aged 6 – daughter of Autumn and Peter Phillips
 Mia Tindall, aged 4 – daughter of Zara and Mike Tindall
 Theodora Williams, aged 6 – daughter of Ayda Field and Robbie Williams
 Maud Windsor, aged 5 – daughter of Lord and Lady Frederick Windsor

Special attendants

 Lady Louise Mountbatten-Windsor, the bride's first cousin
 Viscount Severn, the bride's first cousin

Notable absences 

 The Duchess of Cornwall, the bride's paternal aunt by marriage, previous engagement in Scotland
 The Duchess of Kent, wife of the bride's first cousin, twice removed, semi-retired from royal duties
 Princess Alexandra, The Hon. Lady Ogilvy, the bride's first cousin, twice removed, broken arm

See also
 List of wedding guests of Charles, Prince of Wales, and Lady Diana Spencer (1981)
 List of wedding guests of Prince William and Catherine Middleton (2011)
 List of wedding guests of Prince Harry and Meghan Markle (2018)

References

British royal weddings
2018 in England
Wedding ceremony participants
Prince Andrew, Duke of York
Brooksbank family